Nocturnal is the third studio album by American melodic death metal band The Black Dahlia Murder. It was released through Metal Blade Records on September 18, 2007 and is the band's first album to feature bassist Bart Williams, who replaced Dave Lock, and drummer Shannon Lucas. It is also the last album to feature longtime guitarist John Kempainen.

Background
The name of the second track "What a Horrible Night to Have a Curse", is taken from the name of the band's first demo release of the same name, which in turn is a quote from the 1988 video game Castlevania II: Simon's Quest; the song is featured on the soundtrack for the video game Saints Row 2 and as downloadable content for Rock Band. Kristian Wåhlin did the cover art for the album. The end of the song "Nocturnal" features an audio clip from the movie The Monster Squad. The song "Deathmask Divine" appears to be inspired by both the story of Carl von Cosel and the 1979 Italian horror film Beyond the Darkness.

Track listing

Personnel
The Black Dahlia Murder
 Trevor Strnad – lead vocals
 Brian Eschbach – rhythm guitar, backing vocals 
 John Kempainen – lead guitar
 Ryan "Bart" Williams – bass
 Shannon Lucas – drums

Production
 Executive producer: Brian Slagel
 Produced by Jason Suecof and The Black Dahlia Murder
 Engineered by Mark Lewis and Eric Rachel, with assistance by Eric Kvortek
 Mixed by Jason Suecof
 Vocals engineered by Kyle Neeley (also assistant engineer)

Chart positions

References

2007 albums
The Black Dahlia Murder (band) albums
Metal Blade Records albums
Albums produced by Jason Suecof